The 1995 FIVB World Grand Prix was the third women's volleyball tournament of its kind, played by eight countries from 18 August to 17 September 1995. The final round was staged in Shanghai.

Preliminary rounds

Ranking
The host China and top three teams in the preliminary round advance to the Final round.

|}

First round

Group A
Venue: Honolulu, United States

|}

Group B
Venue: Belo Horizonte, Brazil

|}

Second round

Group C
Venue: Taipei, Taiwan

|}

Group D
Venue: Jakarta, Indonesia

|}

Third round

Group E
Venue: Tokyo, Japan

|}

Group F
Venue: Macau

|}

Fourth round

Group G
Venue: Hamamatsu, Japan

|}

Group H
Venue: Beijing, China

|}

Final round
Venue: Shanghai, China

|}

Final ranking

|}

Final standings

Individual awards
Most Valuable Player:

Best Scorer:

Best Spiker:

Best Blocker:

Best Server:

Best Setter:

Best Receiver:

Dream Team
Setter: 

Middle Blockers:

Outside Hitters:

Opposite Spiker:

References
Results

FIVB World Grand Prix
1995 in Chinese sport
International volleyball competitions hosted by China
1995